The 1931–32 Georgetown Hoyas men's basketball team represented Georgetown University during the 1931–32 NCAA college basketball season. Fred Mesmer coached it in his first season as head coach. Georgetown was an independent and played its home games at Tech Gymnasium on the campus of McKinley Technical High School in Washington, D.C. The team finished with a record of 6-11.

Mesmer had played guard on Georgetowns 1927-28, 1928-29, and 1929-30 teams before graduating in 1930. Less than two years after graduation, he was hired at the age of 23 as the Hoyas head coach. A popular sports figure on campus, he would coach Georgetown for seven seasons, leaving after the end of the 1937-38 season with an overall record of 53-76. Although his teams would go 36-20 (.643) at home, they would manage only a 17-56 (.233) record on the road, and he would have only two winning seasons – 1933-34 and 1936-37 – during his tenure.

This was Georgetowns last season as an independent before beginning a seven-season stint the following year as a member of the Eastern Intercollegiate Conference.

Roster
Sources

Georgetown players did not wear numbers on their jerseys this season. The first numbered jerseys in Georgetown mens basketball history would not appear until the 1933-34 season.

1931–32 schedule and results
Sources

It was common practice at this time for colleges and universities to include non-collegiate opponents in their schedules, with the games recognized as part of their official record for the season, and the games played against the Crescent Athletic Club and the Brooklyn Knights of Columbus therefore counted as part of Georgetowns won-loss record for 1931-32. It was not until 1952, after the completion of the 1951-52 season, that the National Collegiate Athletic Association (NCAA) ruled that colleges and universities could no longer count games played against non-collegiate opponents in their annual won-loss records.

|-
!colspan=9 style="background:#002147; color:#8D817B;"| Regular Season

References

Georgetown Hoyas men's basketball seasons
Georgetown
Georgetown Hoyas men's basketball team
Georgetown Hoyas men's basketball team